Quemedava was an ancient Dacian city in Dardania mentioned by Procopius.

See also 
 Dacian davae
 List of ancient cities in Illyria
 List of ancient cities in Thrace and Dacia
 Dacia
 Roman Dacia

References

Further reading 

 

Dacian towns
Dardania (Roman province)
Former populated places in the Balkans